Liverpool Football Club is an English association football club based in Liverpool, Merseyside. The club was formed in 1892 following a disagreement between the board of Everton and club president John Houlding, who owned the club's ground, Anfield. The disagreement between the two parties over rent resulted in Everton moving to Goodison Park from Anfield, which left Houlding with an empty stadium. Thus, he founded Liverpool F.C. to play in the empty stadium. Liverpool won the First Division title for the first time in 1901; since then, the club has won a further 18 league titles, along with seven FA Cups and nine League Cups. They have also been crowned champions of European football on six occasions by winning the European Cup/UEFA Champions League in 1977, 1978, 1981, 1984, 2005 and 2019. The club was one of 22 members of the Premier League when it was formed in 1992. They experienced the most successful period in their history under the management of Bob Paisley, who guided the team to 21 trophies in nine seasons.

Since Liverpool's first competitive match, more than 700 players have made a competitive first-team appearance for the club. Many of these players spent only a short period of their career at Liverpool before seeking opportunities in other teams; some players had their careers cut short by injury, while others left for other reasons. The First and Second World Wars also disrupted the careers of footballers across the United Kingdom. Keith Burkinshaw only played one match for Liverpool but went on to have a successful managerial career at Tottenham Hotspur, where he won the FA Cup twice. Gordon Wallace, who made 22 appearances for the club, was the scorer of Liverpool's first goal in European competition. He scored the first goal in a 6–0 win over KR Reykjavik in the 1964–65 European Cup. Roy Evans made 11 appearances during his Liverpool career, and later managed the club from 1994 to 1998. The only trophy won during his tenure was the League Cup in 1995.

359 players have played fewer than 25 competitive matches for the club. Six former players – John Miller, John Curran, William Watkinson, Avi Cohen, Torben Piechnik and Sebastián Coates – each made 24 appearances during their spell at Liverpool.

Players
Appearances and goals are for first-team competitive matches only, including Premier League, Football League, FA Cup, Football League Cup, FA Charity/Community Shield, European Cup/UEFA Champions League, UEFA Cup/Europa League, UEFA Cup Winners' Cup, Inter-Cities Fairs Cup, UEFA Super Cup and FIFA Club World Cup matches; wartime matches are regarded as unofficial and are excluded, as are matches from the abandoned 1939–40 season.
Players are listed according to the date of their first-team debut for the club.
Positions are listed according to the tactical formations that were employed at the time. Thus the change in the names of defensive and midfield reflects the tactical evolution that occurred from the 1960s onwards.
Statistics correct .

Table headers
 Nationality – If a player played international football, the country/countries he played for are shown. Otherwise, the player's nationality is given as their country of birth
 Liverpool career – The year of the player's first appearance for Liverpool to the year of his last appearance.
 Starts – The number of games started.
 Sub – The number of games played as a substitute. Substitutions were only introduced to the Football League in the 1960s.
 Total – The total number of games played, both as a starter and as a substitute.

References

External links
 

 
Players (1-25 appearances)
Lists of association football players by club in England
Association football player non-biographical articles